"Just Go" is a song by the American rock band Staind. It was released in May 1999 as the second single from the album Dysfunction, though it had previously been released as a double A-side with "Suffocate" in February 1999.

The song reached number 24 on the US Billboard Mainstream Rock chart. A music video was made for the song and was directed by Limp Bizkit frontman Fred Durst.
The song is featured on the MTV compilation return of the rock.

Track listing 
CD single (Catalog#: PRCD 1243-2)

Charts

References 

Staind songs
1999 singles
Songs written by Aaron Lewis
1998 songs
Elektra Records singles
Songs about depression
Song recordings produced by Terry Date
Songs written by Mike Mushok